Renan de Oliveira Fonseca (born 13 August 1990) is a Brazilian footballer who plays as a central defender.

Honours
Santa Cruz
Campeonato Pernambucano: 2013
Campeonato Brasileiro Série C: 2013

Botafogo
Taça Guanabara: 2015
Campeonato Brasileiro Série B: 2015

References

1990 births
Living people
Brazilian footballers
Association football defenders
Campeonato Brasileiro Série A players
Campeonato Brasileiro Série B players
Campeonato Brasileiro Série C players
Associação Atlética Ponte Preta players
Ituano FC players
Red Bull Brasil players
Marília Atlético Clube players
Santa Cruz Futebol Clube players
Botafogo de Futebol e Regatas players
People from Ouro Fino
Sportspeople from Minas Gerais